WBCR-FM (90.3 FM) is a radio station  broadcasting a Variety format. Licensed to Beloit, Wisconsin, United States.  The station is currently owned by The Board of Trustees of Beloit College.

History
The station first aired in 1907 as an early experimental radio station ran by Dr. Charles Aaron Culver. It is one of the oldest radio stations in the world. The station went on the air as WBCR-FM on 1979-08-22.  on 1984-10-01, the station changed its call sign to WBCR, on 1989-08-22 to the current WBCR.

References

External links

BCR-FM
BCR-FM
Radio stations established in 1979
1979 establishments in Wisconsin